David Greenlee (born March 19, 1960) is an American voice actor and actor best known for his portrayals of the nerdy hall monitor Dwight in seasons two through five of the 1982 television series Fame and Mouse in the fantasy series Beauty and the Beast. Prior to that, Greenlee was a champion on Password Plus in 1979.

Filmography

Movies

Television

References

External links
 

American male television actors
Living people
American male voice actors
1960 births
20th-century American male actors